Sinclair Head (Te Rimurapa) is a major promontory on the south coast of New Zealand's North Island.

The headland is named for Sir George Sinclair, a director of the New Zealand Company. The Māori name literally means "the search for seaweed".

Sinclair Head is home to a non-breeding colony of New Zealand fur seals, with resident seal numbers ranging from over 300 in winter to about 50 in summer when only the non-breeding males stay behind. The seal haul-out is also known as the Red Rocks seal colony, named after an area of red coloured rocks immediately east of the headland.

References

Headlands of the Wellington Region